Performing Animals; or, Skipping Dogs is an 1895 British short black-and-white silent documentary film, produced and directed by Birt Acres for exhibition on Robert W. Paul's peep show Kinetoscopes, featuring one dog jumping through hoops and another dancing in a costume. The film was considered lost until footage from an 1896 Fairground Programme, originally shown in a portable booth at Hull Fair by Midlands photographer George Williams, donated to the National Fairground Archive was identified as being from this film.

Current status
Given its age, this short film is available to freely download from the Internet.

References

British black-and-white films
British silent short films
1890s short documentary films
Black-and-white documentary films
Films directed by Birt Acres
Films about dogs
1890s rediscovered films
British short documentary films
Rediscovered British films